Southsider or Southsiders may refer to:

Geography
Southsiders, or Vancouver Southsiders, independent supporters group for Vancouver Whitecaps FC of Major League Soccer 
Southsiders, natives of Southside, Dublin, notable Southsiders including Maeve Binchy
Southsiders, natives of the Gorbals in Glasgow
Southsiders, natives of South Side, Chicago

Music
Southsiders (album), a 2014 album by Atmosphere
The Southsiders, original band of Dave Stewart (keyboardist)

Films
The Southsiders, 1932 Swedish film

See also
 Southside (disambiguation)